Cookstown is a stop on the Luas light-rail tram system in Dublin, Ireland.  It opened in 2004 as a stop on the Red Line.  The stop is located on a section of reserved track at the side of Cookstown Way in south-west Dublin.  
The stop is also served by Dublin Bus routes 56 and 210.

References

Luas Red Line stops in South Dublin (county)